is a Japanese film directed by Shūsuke Kaneko. Actress Hinako Saeki won the Newcomer of the Year award at the Japan Academy Awards and Best New Talent at the Yokohama Film Festival for her role in this film.

Cast
Shirō Sano
Hinako Saeki
Hitomi Takahashi
Tōru Masuoka
Akira Onodera
Jun Fubuki

References

Sources

 
 

1994 films
1990s Japanese-language films
Films directed by Shusuke Kaneko
Films scored by Kow Otani
1990s Japanese films